The gold-colored angle fish (Sinocyclocheilus angularis) is a species of cyprinid fish.

It is found only in China.

References

angularis
Fish described in 1990
Freshwater fish of China
Cyprinid fish of Asia
Taxonomy articles created by Polbot